Bay United was a South African professional football (soccer) club based first in the city of Port Elizabeth and later Polokwane. It played in the South African Premier Division and National First Division.

The club came into existence in 2006 when the franchise of struggling National First Division club Maritzburg United was purchased and relocated to Port Elizabeth. The club also purchased the Vodacom League franchise of the NMMU F.C. The club spent one season in the Premier Soccer League, and the other years of its existence in the National First Division.

Following the 2010–11 NFD season, the club's NFD franchise was moved to Polokwane, Limpopo. It played the 2011–12 season under the name Bay United. In 2012, it became Polokwane City. The Vodacom League team became Bay Stars.

Ownership
The club was owned by Volkswagen South Africa during the 2006–07 NFD season. After the 2006–07 season Sipho Pityana purchased the club through his company, Izingwe Holdings and VW became the team's main sponsor.

The club's future was unknown during the 2010 off season as owner Sipho Pityana had said that the club would cease conducting business, while attempting to sell the club.

The main reason given for selling the club were, a lack of funds, stemming from the teams demotion from the PSL at the end of the 2008/2009 season. The reduction in income due to playing in the NFD, as well as a fine for releasing players seem to be the main causes for the club's problems. Pityana had said that he would however be willing to sell the club, should a buyer come forward.

The league franchise was eventually sold to Striving Mind Trading 522 CC, a Limpopo based company, headed by Julia Mogaladi. She is the niece of John Mogaladi, chairman of the Limpopo-based football club, Winners Park. They announced that the team would be moved to Limpopo, but it remained in Port Elizabeth for the 2010–11 season.

In August 2012, the PSL approved of the renaming of the franchise to Polokwane City.

Home stadium
When the club was first formed, it played its matches at the Wolfson Stadium, in KwaZakhele, Port Elizabeth. Following the 2007–08 NFD season, and the club's promotion to the PSL, the stadium was deemed below league standards. The team then moved its home matches to the EPRU Stadium in Port Elizabeth for the 2008–09 Premier Soccer League. The team shared the stadium with Eastern Province rugby team. During the season, the team also hosted some matches at East London's Buffalo City Stadium.

The team was relegated at the end of the 2008–09 PSL season, and then moved its home matches to the smaller Westbourne Oval. During the 2009–10 National First Division season, the team experienced scheduling issues, and was forced to also host matches at NMMU's Xerox Stadium, and the EPRU Stadium.

During the 2010–11 National First Division season the team began by hosting its matches at the Westbourne Oval, but later shifted to hosting its matches at the Gelvandale Stadium.

The youth team played its home matches at the NU2 Stadium.

After moving to Limpopo, the club played at Old Peter Mokaba Stadium, University of Limpopo Stadium and Seshego Stadiumin Polokwane.

Honours
First Division promotion/Premier League relegation Play-offs: 1
2007-08

Club records
Premier Soccer League: 
2008–09 – 16th

National First Division: 
2006–07 – 13th
2007–08 – 2nd (Coastal Stream) (promoted through play-offs)
2009–10 – 3rd (Coastal Stream)
2010–11 – 1st (Coastal Stream)
2011–12 – 10th (Polokwane City playing under the Bay United name)

Nedbank Cup: 
2007 – Round of 32
2008 – NFD Qualification Round
2009 – Round of 16
2010 – NFD Qualification Round
2011 – NFD Qualification Round
2012 – Round of 32 (Polokwane City playing under the Bay United name)

Telkom Knockout: 
2008 – Quarter-Finals

Baymed Cup: 
2006 – Round of 16

Sponsorship
The team's main sponsor is Volkswagen South Africa, who had previously owned the club. The team is also sponsored by Aberdare Cables. Puma is the team's technical sponsor.

Former coaches
 Vladislav Heric: 2006 – 2008
 Pernell McKop: 2008
 Khabo Zondo: 2008 – 2009
 Eddie Dyaloyi: 2009
 David Bright: 2009 – 2012

Caretaker coach

References

External links
Bay United Official Website
Premier Soccer League
NFD Club Info

Association football clubs established in 2006
National First Division clubs
Soccer clubs in Port Elizabeth
Soccer clubs in Limpopo
Premier Soccer League clubs
2006 establishments in South Africa
2012 disestablishments in South Africa
Polokwane